Karel de Grote University of Applied Sciences and Arts is a Roman Catholic higher educational institution in Antwerp, Belgium. The school was founded after a merger of thirteen educational institutions in Antwerp in 1995. It was named after Charles the Great. It has about 13,000 students and 1,225 employees.

References

External links

Catholic universities and colleges in Belgium
Education in Antwerp